Catherine McAuley High School was a small, all-girls', private, Catholic high school in the East Flatbush section of Brooklyn, New York.  Founded by the Brooklyn Sisters of Mercy in 1942, it is located in the Roman Catholic Diocese of Brooklyn. It remains the only all-girls' Catholic high school in Brooklyn or Queens to have earned the Blue Ribbon Award from the U.S. Department of Education.
McAuley closed at the end of the 2012-2013 school year. The closing was the result of declining enrollment due to changing demographics, the increasing number of charter schools, rising costs, and the economic downturn.  The final commencement took place on Saturday, June 1, 2013.

Background

Catherine McAuley High School is dedicated to "preparing young Christian women for life."  The school was named for the woman who founded the Sisters of Mercy in 1831 in Dublin, Ireland after she inherited the equivalent of 1 million dollars from a former employer. She dedicated her life and her Sisters to serving the poor, sick and uneducated.

The school's original name was Catherine McAuley "Commercial" High School, reflecting the fact that from the 1940s through the 1960s, most graduates went directly to the workforce after high school.  Since the 1980s most McAuley graduates have continued their education, and the success of its college preparatory curriculum is evidenced by annual graduation and college acceptance rates near 100%.  McAuley adheres to the New York State Curriculum guidelines and grants an amazing amount of financial aid to many students.  Numerous after school activities exist so young women can explore their hidden talents and pursue areas of interest.

Accomplishments

In 1991, Catherine McAuley earned the prestigious title, "Nationally Recognized School of Excellence," from the United States Department of Education.  McAuley is the only all-girls Catholic high school in Brooklyn or Queens to earn this distinction.

In 2002, Catherine McAuley High School was the first in New York City to offer a boarding program for teenagers.  The boarding program is administered in partnership with Boys Hope Girls Hope of New York, a nonprofit organization founded in 1977 which helps academically capable and motivated children from abuse, neglect or otherwise at-risk situations to meet their full potential by providing value-centered, family-like homes, opportunities, and education through college. McAuley Convent, home to many Sisters of Mercy from 1950 to 2001, now serves as a dormitory for over 40 students who live there five days per week. Students in the boarding program, referred to as "Scholars," are expected to maintain an 85 GPA and follow a disciplined course of study for their academic and moral development.

References
Notes

External links
 School Website

Sisters of Mercy schools
Defunct Catholic secondary schools in New York City
Educational institutions established in 1942
Educational institutions disestablished in 2013
Girls' schools in New York City
Roman Catholic Diocese of Brooklyn
Boarding schools in New York (state)
Education in Brooklyn
East Flatbush, Brooklyn
1942 establishments in New York City
2013 disestablishments in New York (state)
Roman Catholic high schools in Brooklyn